Mecco is an administrative ward in Ilemela District, Mwanza Region, Tanzania. In 2016 the Tanzania National Bureau of Statistics report there were 15,746 people in the ward.

Villages 
The ward has 5 villages.

 Mecco Mashariki
 Mecco Kaskazini
 Mecco Kusini
 Nundu
 Gedeli Kivukoni

References

Wards of Mwanza Region
Ilemela District
Constituencies of Tanzania